Zlatko Crnković (27 May 1936 – 14 February 2012) was a Croatian actor.

He received the Vladimir Nazor Award for lifetime achievement in theatre in 2008.

He died after a cardiac arrest on 14 February 2012 aged 76.

Filmography

Television roles 
 Bitange i princeze as judge (2005)
 Olujne tišine as Aleksandar pl. Radočaj (1997)
 Putovanje u Vučjak as Šipušić (1986)
 Nikola Tesla as Ben Johnson (1977)
 U registraturi as župnik (1974)
 Kuda idu divlje svinje as Veno (1971)

Movie roles 
 Tu as Josip (2003)
 Duga ponoć (2003)
 Kuća duhova as Illustrissimus (1998)
 Čudnovate zgode šegrta Hlapića as storyteller (1997)
 Proljeće Ivana B. (1995)
 Gospa as Zoran Ranković (1994)
 Kamenita vrata (1992)
 Luka (1992)
 Vila Orhideja as uncle (1988)
 Olujna noć (1987)
 Nitko se neće smijati as Hofman (1985)
 Horvatov izbor (1985)
 Heda Gabler (1985)
 Pod starim krovovima (1984)
 Ifigenija u Aulidi (1983)
 Ustrijelite Kastora (1982)
 Obiteljski album (1981)
 Poglavlje iz života Augusta Šenoe (1981)
 Obustava u strojnoj (1980)
 Dekreti (1980)
 Ljubica (1979)
 Istarska rapsodija (1978)
 Car se zabavlja (1975)
 Timon (1973)
 Okreni leđa vjetru (1972)
 Kainov znak (1970)
 Ožiljak (1969)
 Mirotvorci (1966)
 Mokra koža (1966)
 Nevesinjska puška (1963)
 Opasni put as Willy (1963)
 Martin u oblacima as inspector (1961)
 Siva bilježnica (1961)
 Pustolov pred vratima (1961)
 Kota 905 (1960)
 Vlak bez voznog reda (1959)
 Naši se putovi razilaze (1957)

References

External links

1936 births
2012 deaths
Croatian male stage actors
Croatian male television actors
Croatian male film actors
Vladimir Nazor Award winners
Male actors from Zagreb